SM UC-62 was a German Type UC II minelaying submarine or U-boat in the German Imperial Navy during World War I. The U-boat was ordered on 12 January 1916, laid down on 3 April 1916, and was launched on 9 December 1916. She was commissioned into the German Imperial Navy on 8 January 1917 as SM UC-62. In nine patrols UC-62 was credited with sinking 11 ships, either by torpedo or by mines laid. On 19 March 1917, the submerged Royal Navy submarine  suffered damage in a collision UC-62 in the North Sea off the North Hinder Light Vessel. UC-62 struck a mine and sank in the North Sea off Zeebrugge, Belgium, on 14 October 1917.

Design
A German Type UC II submarine, UC-62 had a displacement of  when at the surface and  while submerged. The submarine was powered by two six-cylinder four-stroke diesel engines each producing  (a total of ), two electric motors producing , and two propeller shafts.

UC-62 was fitted with six  mine tubes, eighteen UC 200 mines, three  torpedo tubes (one on the stern and two on the bow), seven torpedoes, and one  Uk L/30 deck gun. Her complement was twenty-six crew members.

Summary of raiding history

References

Notes

Citations

Bibliography

 
 

Ships built in Bremen (state)
German Type UC II submarines
U-boats commissioned in 1917
U-boats sunk by mines
U-boats sunk in 1917
Maritime incidents in 1917
World War I minelayers of Germany
World War I shipwrecks in the North Sea
World War I submarines of Germany
1916 ships
Ships lost with all hands